Valasaravakkam is a neighbourhood in the Chennai district of the Indian state of Tamil Nadu and a residential suburb of the city of Chennai.  It is located in the Poonamallee Taluk at a distance of approximately 15 kilometres from the Kilometer Zero stone. Valasaravakkam lies on the Arcot Road, one of Chennai's arterial roads. It is under the Maduravoyal election constituency. In October, 2011 Valasaravakkam Municipality ceased to exist and the area became part of Chennai Corporation as Ward Nos 149 and 152 (Zone XI), Southern Region, Corporation of Chennai. As of 2011, the town had a population of 47,378.
Famous Sivan temple is in Kesavardhini.

History 
The first planned residential colonies in Valasaravakkam made their appearance during the Second World War. Prior to the war, Valasaravakkam was a small village forming a part of the Saidapet taluk of Chingleput district. Due to its remoteness, development took place at a slow pace until the 1980s. Its strategic location on the Arcot Road has resulted in accelerated growth since then.

Demographics 

According to 2011 census, Valasaravakkam had a population of 47,378 with a sex-ratio of 1,004 females for every 1,000 males, much above the national average of 929. A total of 4,696 were under the age of six, constituting 2,439 males and 2,257 females. Scheduled Castes and Scheduled Tribes accounted for 7.01% and 0.09% of the population, respectively. The average literacy of the town was 86.39%, compared to the national average of 72.99%. The town had a total of  12,278 households. There were a total of 18,485 workers, comprising 117 cultivators, 75 main agricultural labourers, 338 in household industries, 16,379 other workers, 1,576 marginal workers, 29 marginal cultivators, 14 marginal agricultural labourers, 58 marginal workers in household industries and 1,475 other marginal workers. As per the religious census of 2011, Valasaravakkam had 90.12% Hindus, 3.42% Muslims, 5.79% Christians, 0.05% Sikhs, 0.01% Buddhists, 0.17% Jains, 0.44% following other religions and 0.0% following no religion or did not indicate any religious preference.

Infrastructure

BBCL and Purvankara have developed major residential projects in Valasaravakkam. There are also big apartments on the Arcot Road. The region has good sewage and road infrastructure. A film called 'Veedu' was based on Valasaravakkam.

Newspapers 
Valasai Times is the only local Neighborhood Magazine in the region of Valasaravakkam since 2003.

Places of worship
The Velveeswarar Temple is a very famous temple with Lord Velveeswarar - Goddess Thiripurasundari and Lord Agatheeswarar. It has a large temple pond which is located in the busiest arcot road.

Sri Venkata Subramaniya Temple is located at SVS Nagar which is dedicated to Lord Muruga.

Arulmigu Lakshmi Vinayagar - Anjenayar Temple is in Kamakodi Nagar.

Sri Kulakkarai Suyambu Vinayagar Temple is located at Arcot Road near Velveeswarar Temple.

The Venkatesa Perumal Temple is located in Sri Devi Kuppam Main Road.

Puthu Koil is located in the Sri Devi Kuppam Main Road.

Nearly 500 years old Selli Amman Temple at Arcot Road near Lamech School.

Sri Sumuga Ganapathy Temple at kaikankuppam.

Sri Kamatchi Amman Temple at Bethania Nagar.

Sri Chinthamani Vinayagar Temple is located at Gandhi Road, Alwarthirunagar.

Sri Krishna Temple is located at Durai Raj Street near Anjappar Hotel.

Sri Ananda Vinayagar Temple at Chowdry Nagar. 
Sri Dharmasastha Temple in Alwarthiru Nagar.

Sri Raja Ganapathy Temple at Kamakodi Nagar.

Sri Navasakthi Vinayagar Temple at Brindhavan Nagar.

Sri Gangaiamman Temple at Kaikankuppam.

Sri Muthumariamman Temple at Muthumariamman Koil Street near Hot Chips.

Sri Vishwaroopa Sai Baba temple at Kamakodi Nagar.

Sri Sai Baba temple at Majestic Colony.

Bethel Christian Assembly at Subramaniya Swamy Nagar

Annai Velankanni Church, Brindavan colony, adjacent to Shell petrol bunk.

References

Neighbourhoods in Chennai